= Pierre Viette =

French entomologist (1921–2011)

- Born: 29 June 1921; France
- Died: 30 April 2011 (aged 89)

Pierre Edmond Léon Viette (29 June 1921 – 30 April 2011) was a French entomologist. He attended university in Dijon during the German occupation of France in World War II, then spent his entire career at the Muséum national d'Histoire naturelle in Paris. He specialized in insect systematics, especially Lepidoptera, and had over 400 articles published.

== See also ==
- Category:Taxa named by Pierre Viette

== External references ==
- Dayrat, Benoît (2003). Les botanistes et la flore de France, trois siècles de découvertres. Paris: Publications scientifiques du Muséum national d'histoire naturelle. doi:10.4000/books.mnhn.1905. ISBN 978-2-85653-548-6. 690 pp. (in French).
- Lhoste, Jean (1987). Les Entomologistes français. 1750-1950. Paris: INRA (Institute national de la recherche agrinomique) Éditions. 351 pp. (in French).
